Kulka is a surname. Notable people with the surname include:

 Gabriela Kulka (born 1979), Polish musician
 Glenn Kulka (born 1964), Canadian professional wrestler
 János Kulka (actor) (born 1958), Hungarian actor
 János Kulka (conductor) (1929–2001), Hungarian conductor and composer
 Leopoldine Kulka (1872–1920), Austrian writer and editor
 Otto Dov Kulka (1933-2021), Israeli historian